The Hotel d'Angleterre is one of the first deluxe hotels in the world.  Situated in the heart of Copenhagen, Denmark, it is located on Kongens Nytorv opposite Charlottenborg, the Royal Opera and Nyhavn. While its history dates back to 1755, it has been in its current building since a fire, in 1795, damaged the previous building beyond repair. From 1872 to 1875, the building was significantly extended and refurbished by the architects, Vilhelm Dahlerup and Georg E.W. Møller The hotel has long been considered the most prestigious and elegant hotel in the city. Its name is French and means the "England Hotel".

The Hotel d'Angleterre re-opened in May 2013 following extensive restorations. The new d'Angleterre has 30 rooms and 60 suites. It also has a 1-star Michelin restaurant, "Marchal", led by executive chef, Jakob de Neergaard, a cocktail and champagne bar as well as a spa and health club.

Awards
Condé Nast Traveler has included the Hotel D'Angleterre on its Gold List 2015 of the best hotels in the world.

Cultural references
The kitchen of Hotel D'Angleterre is used as location for the fictional restaurant Maxim at 0:35:23 in the 1978 Olsen-banden film The Olsen Gang Sees Red.

The protagonist (played by Paul Newman) stays on Hotel d'Angleterre on his way to the GDR in the 1966 Alfred Hitchcock spy film Torn Curtain and Hitchcock is in one of the scenes seen sitting in the lobby with a baby in his arms.

Notable guests

 AC/DC
 Bono
 Grif Chafey
 H.C. Andersen
 Morten Andersen
 Cecilia Bartoli
 David Beckham
 Dogukan Nas
 Karen Blixen
 Victor Borge
 Mariah Carey
 José Carreras
 Helena Christensen
 Winston Churchill
 John Cleese
 Bill Clinton
 Michael Davitt
 Cameron Diaz
 Walt Disney
 Barbara Hendricks
 Alfred Hitchcock
 Whitney Houston
 Henrik Ibsen
 Julio Iglesias
 Michael Jackson
 Billy Joel
 Jon Bon Jovi
 Juan Carlos I of Spain
 Grace Kelly
 Diana Krall
 Madonna
 Anne-Sophie Mutter
 Brigitte Nielsen
 Connie Nielsen
 Ozzy Osbourne
 David Rockefeller
 Rolling Stones
 Claudia Schiffer
 Arnold Schwarzenegger
 Justin Timberlake
 U2
 Lars Ulrich
 Robbie Williams
 Oprah Winfrey
 Angus Young

References

External links

 Hotel web site
 
 Source
 Source

The Leading Hotels of the World
Hotels in Copenhagen
Historicist architecture in Copenhagen
Vilhelm Dahlerup buildings
Hotel buildings completed in 1875